The 2018–19 Nîmes Olympique season was the first season since 1992-93 for Nîmes Olympique in Ligue 1, the top tier of professional football league in the French football league system.

Current squad

Competitions

Ligue 1

League table

Results summary

Results by round

Matches

Coupe de France

Coupe de la Ligue

References

Nîmes Olympique seasons
Nîmes Olympique